= Haaheo Seamount =

Seamount in the Pacific Ocean

- Location within Pacific Ocean
- Summit depth: −1,616 m (−5,302 ft)
- Height: 3,265 m (10,712 ft)
- Summit area: 224.82 km2

Location
- Location: Pacific Ocean
- Coordinates: 24°37′26.57″N 172°44′26.04″W

Haaheo Seamount is a seamount near the Midway Atoll, Sovereign Seamount, Euphemia Seamount, Don Quixote Seamount, and the Northampton Seamounts.
