= Sovereign Seamount =

Seamount in the Pacific Ocean

- Map showing location of Sovereign Seamount
- Summit depth: 2,113 metres (6,932 ft)
- Height: 2,431 metres (7,976 ft)
- Summit area: 5.51 square kilometres (2.13 sq mi)

Location
- Location: Pacific Ocean
- Coordinates: 24°19′38.52″N 173°6′10.40″W

Sovereign Seamount is a seamount near the Midway Atoll and the Northampton Seamounts.
