= Northampton Seamounts =

Seamount in the Pacific Ocean

- Location within Pacific Ocean
- Summit depth: −371 m (−1,217 ft)
- Height: 2,792 m (9,160 ft)

Location
- Location: Pacific Ocean
- Coordinates: 25°21′22.22″N 172°3′26.60″W

The Northampton Seamounts are a small group of seamounts near the Midway Atoll. It consists of two unnamed seamounts: one that is elliptical, the other shaped like a 'V'.
